The Parklinks Bridge is a road bridge connecting Pasig and Quezon City in Metro Manila, Philippines.

Background
The Parklinks Bridge is a structure which crosses over the Marikina River connecting the cities of Pasig and Quezon City. It is part of the Parklinks mixed-use development of Alveo, a subsidiary of Ayala Land, and Eton Properties. It has Systra Philippines and Systra Korea as its structural designers. It was inaugated on November 28, 2022.

References

Bridges in Metro Manila
Buildings and structures in Quezon City
Buildings and structures in Marikina